Saetti is an Italian surname. Notable people with the surname include:

Bruno Saetti (1902–1984), Italian painter
Roberto Saetti (born 1967), Italian rugby union player

Italian-language surnames